The 3d Mississippi Cavalry Regiment (also known as the "Third Mississippi") was a cavalry formation in the Western Theater of the American Civil War commanded by Colonel John McGuirk.

History 
The regiment was established on June 9, 1863, in the Mississippi Militia at Panola of cavalry from new and existing companies, as the 3d Mississippi State Cavalry Regiment and assigned to the 5th Military District, Department of Mississippi and East Louisiana. It was reorganized in April, 1864, and mustered into Confederate service on May 3, 1864, as the 3d Mississippi Cavalry Regiment. The regiment was disbanded on May 12, 1865, at Gainesville, Alabama.

Regimental order of battle 
Units of McGuirk's regiment included:

 Company A
 Company B
 Company C
 Company D
 Company E
 Company F 
 Company G 
 Company H
 Company I
 Company K

See also 
 List of Mississippi Civil War Confederate units

Notes

References

Further reading 
 
 
 
 

1863 establishments in Mississippi
1865 disestablishments in Alabama
Cavalry regiments
Military units and formations established in 1863
Military units and formations disestablished in 1865
Units and formations of the Confederate States Army from Mississippi